Robert Nance Haskell (August 24, 1903 – December 3, 1987) was a Maine state senator and the 65th Governor of Maine for five days in 1959.

Haskell graduated from the University of Maine with an engineering degree in 1925. He became a design engineer with the Bangor Hydro-Electric Company and rose to president of the company in 1958. He was elected as a Republican to the Maine House of Representatives in 1945.  After serving one term, he was elected to the Maine Senate in 1947 and served five terms, including two as majority leader and two as president of the Senate. He was nicknamed "Slide Rule Bob" for his mathematical abilities.

On January 2, 1959, outgoing Governor Edmund Muskie resigned before the end of his term to take his seat in the United States Senate.  Haskell was sworn in as Governor to fill the five-day period until the inauguration of Clinton Clauson.  With Clauson's death later in the year, Haskell was the second of four governors Maine had in 1959.

Haskell then left politics, but continued to lead the Bangor Hydro-Electric Company, as well as serving as a bank board chairman and a trustee of the University of Maine. He died in 1987.

He was not closely related to Nathaniel M. Haskell, who had served a brief term six years before as Maine's Governor due to being Senate President.

References

External links
 Maine Senate profile
 National Governors Association profile
 James V. Horrigan, "Passing the Blaine House baton", Portland Press Herald, October 22, 2006

1903 births
1987 deaths
Republican Party members of the Maine House of Representatives
Majority leaders of the Maine Senate
Presidents of the Maine Senate
Republican Party Maine state senators
Republican Party governors of Maine
Politicians from Bangor, Maine
University of Maine alumni
20th-century American politicians